Jazireh-ye Shomali (also Romanized as Jazīreh-ye Shomālī; also known as Jahreh, Jalīreh, Jazire, and Jazīreh) is a village in Rudhaleh Rural District, Rig District, Ganaveh County, Bushehr Province, Iran. At the 2006 census, its population was 839, in 160 families.

References 

Populated places in Ganaveh County